Albert Le Grand (1599 in Morlaix – 1641 in Rennes) was a Breton hagiographer and a Dominican brother.

Biography 
He made his profession in the Rennes monastery before being assigned to that in his hometown in 1622 or 1623. Born Jean Le Grand, he chose the name Albertus Magnus after the saint canonized in 1622.

Works 
His writings, devoted to Breton hagiographic and historical subjects, were very popular. He is best known for his Lives of the Saints of Armorican Brittany, published in 1637 in Nantes by Pierre Doriou, and for which he notably used ancient manuscripts no longer extant.

This first Breton hagiographical work includes 78 lives of saints, 3 stories and 9 episcopal catalogs, one for each of the historical Breton dioceses (Saint-Pol-de-Léon, Quimper, Tréguier, Saint-Brieuc, Vannes, Saint-Malo, Nantes, Dol-de-Bretagne and Rennes).

The work was expanded and republished under the auspices of Guy Autret of Missirien (Rennes, Jean Vatar, 1659), who had collaborated with the Dominican, in 1680. Daniel-Louis Miorcec de Kerdanet offered a new edition, without the episcopal catalogs, in 1837 (P. Anner in Brest).

The standard edition remains that of the "Three Canons", published in 1901 (J. Salaün, Quimper) by Alexandre-Marie Thomas, Jean-Marie Abgrall and Paul Peyron.

Albert Le Grand also published in 1640 the Providence of God on the Righteous in the Admirable History of St. Budoc Archbishop of Dol in J. Durand in Rennes. This life of saint Budoc has been integrated into the successive reissues of the Lives of the Saints of the Armorican Brittany (with the modified title since its second reissue in 1680 as Lives of the Saints of Armorican Brittany).

Bibliography 
 La vie, gestes, mort et miracles des Saints de la Bretagne Armorique, ensemble un catalogue des évêques des neuf eveschés d'icelle (1659) available at Google Books.
 Les vies des saints de la Bretagne Armorique (1901) 

1599 births
1641 deaths
People from Morlaix
Writers from Brittany
Christian hagiographers
17th-century Breton people